Eric William Fisher (born January 5, 1991) is an American football offensive tackle for the Miami Dolphins of the National Football League (NFL). He played college football at Central Michigan University, and was selected first overall by the Kansas City Chiefs in the 2013 NFL Draft. He played for the Chiefs for eight seasons from 2013 to 2020, making two Pro Bowls and winning Super Bowl LIV over the San Francisco 49ers.

Early years
Fisher and his sister were raised in Rochester, Michigan by his mother. During that time, she also overcame thyroid cancer while raising them on her own. He attended Stoney Creek High School, where he was an All-State honorable mention lineman for the football team. Regarded as a two-star recruit by Rivals.com, he was not ranked among the best offensive tackle prospects in his class. According to Fisher, this was due to him being undersized for an offensive tackle, weighing only 225 pounds as a high school senior.

College career
Fisher played at Central Michigan University from 2009 to 2012 where he was recognized as a first-team All-American by Pro Football Weekly, a second-team selection by Sports Illustrated, and received third-team honors from the Associated Press.  He was also a first-team All-Mid-American Conference (MAC) selection.  Fisher was a part of two bowl wins while at Central Michigan; the 2010 GMAC Bowl and the 2012 Little Caesars Pizza Bowl.

Professional career

Kansas City Chiefs

Fisher was considered one of the top offensive tackles (and overall players) available in the 2013 NFL Draft. He was selected by the Kansas City Chiefs with the first overall pick, becoming the first MAC player to be drafted No. 1 overall. Fisher is one of two Central Michigan players to be selected in the first round of an NFL Draft; the other is Joe Staley.

On July 26, 2013, Fisher signed a guaranteed contract with the Chiefs worth $22.1 million with a $14.5 million signing bonus. Despite playing left tackle during college, Fisher transitioned to right tackle for the 2013 season. He allowed 7 sacks and 35 hurries. According to Pro Football Focus, his run-blocking grade of −6.5 ranked 55th out of 76 NFL tackles who played at least 25 percent of their team's snaps. His overall grade as a tackle ranked 70th. Despite Fisher's struggles during his rookie season, Chiefs general manager John Dorsey noted Fisher's potential and expressed confidence that he would develop into a good player. Fisher played in 14 games, of which he started 13, during his rookie year of 2013.

In March 2014, head coach Andy Reid announced that he was moving Fisher to the left tackle position for the upcoming 2014 season, following the loss of Branden Albert in free agency. During the 2015 season, Fisher played in 16 games, starting in 14.

On May 2, 2016, the Chiefs picked up the fifth-year option Fisher's contract. On July 30, 2016, Fisher signed a four-year contract extension with the Chiefs worth $48 million, including $40 million guaranteed. In Week 1, after a strong performance, Pro Football Focus ranked Fisher as the number one left tackle of the week. In the divisional round of the 2016 playoffs against the Pittsburgh Steelers, the Chiefs were down 18–10 in the 4th quarter. Following a successful two-point conversion, Fisher was called on a holding penalty that resulted in a loss of 10 yards. On the second attempt from the Steelers' 12-yard line, the Chiefs failed the two-point conversion, resulting in their elimination from the playoffs as they lost to the Steelers by a score of 18–16.

In 2019, Fisher was limited to eight games due to injuries. Fisher and the Chiefs went on to win Super Bowl LIV, their first championship in 50 years.

Following the release of long-time Chiefs punter Dustin Colquitt in the 2020 offseason, Fisher became tied with Anthony Sherman and fellow 2013 draftee Travis Kelce as the longest tenured members of the Chiefs. In the Week 3 game of the Chiefs' 2020 season against the Baltimore Ravens, Fisher lined up as an eligible receiver and caught a two-yard pass for a touchdown, the first of his career. The touchdown was the first receiving touchdown scored by a number one overall selection since Keyshawn Johnson in 2006. Fisher was placed on the reserve/COVID-19 list by the Chiefs on November 16, 2020, and activated three days later.

On January 24, 2021, against the Buffalo Bills in the AFC Championship Game, Fisher suffered a torn Achilles, forcing him to miss Super Bowl LV. He was placed on injured reserve on February 6. The Chiefs would go on to lose 31–9 to the Tampa Bay Buccaneers.

Fisher was released after eight seasons on March 11, 2021.

Indianapolis Colts
On May 12, 2021, Fisher signed a one-year, $8.38 million deal with the Indianapolis Colts.

Miami Dolphins
On December 5, 2022, the Miami Dolphins signed Fisher to their active roster. On January 6, 2023, Fisher was placed on injured reserve despite being inactive for every game.

References

External links
Central Michigan Chippewas bio
Kansas City Chiefs bio
ESPN bio
Pro Football Reference bio

1991 births
Living people
Players of American football from Michigan
People from Rochester, Michigan
People from Rochester Hills, Michigan
American football offensive tackles
Central Michigan Chippewas football players
National Football League first-overall draft picks
Kansas City Chiefs players
Indianapolis Colts players
Miami Dolphins players
American Conference Pro Bowl players
Ed Block Courage Award recipients